Richard Vogt (26 January 1913 – 13 July 1988) was a German boxer who competed in the 1936 Summer Olympics.

In 1936 he won the silver medal in the light heavyweight class after losing the final against Roger Michelot.

1936 Olympic results
Below is the record of Richard Vogt, a German light heavyweight boxer who competed at the 1936 Berlin Olympics:

 Round of 32: bye
 Round of 16: defeated Erminio Bolzan (Italy) on points
 Quarterfinal: defeated Hannes Koivunen (Finland) on points
 Semifinal: defeated Francisco Risiglione (Argentina) on points
 Final: lost to Roger Michelot (France) on points (was awarded silver medal)

Pro career
After turning pro in 1938 Vogt, known as "Riedl", became a three-time German Light Heavyweight champion, and in 1942 lost on points in a fight for the European Light Heavyweight Title against Luigi Musina. In 1948, before a crowd of 20,000 in Berlin, he beat former World Heavyweight champion Max Schmeling, aged 43, in the latter's last fight. Vogt had another 15 fights and retired at the age of 39 in 1952.

References
 databaseolympics.com

External links

1913 births
1988 deaths
Light-heavyweight boxers
Olympic boxers of Germany
Boxers at the 1936 Summer Olympics
Olympic silver medalists for Germany
Olympic medalists in boxing
German male boxers
Medalists at the 1936 Summer Olympics